Luis Carlos Cuartero Laforga (born 17 August 1975) is a Spanish former footballer who played as a right back or a central defender.

His professional career, hindered by several serious injuries, was devoted to a single club, Real Zaragoza.

Club career
Cuartero was born in Zaragoza, Aragon. He made his senior debut with hometown's Real Zaragoza on 20 June 1993 in a 2–2 away draw against Atlético Madrid, aged 17, and went on to appear in 178 La Liga games, plus the 2002–03 season in the second division.

From 2006 to 2009, however, Cuartero would only play three league matches combined, severely hindered by knee injuries. Never more than a utility player, his best league output came in the 2003–04 campaign, when he featured in 24 contests for a final 12th place; he finally retired from the game at the end of 2008–09, with the Maños again in the second level.

Honours
Zaragoza
Copa del Rey: 2000–01, 2003–04 
Supercopa de España: 2004

Spain U21
UEFA European Under-21 Championship: 1998

See also
List of one-club men

References

External links

1975 births
Living people
Footballers from Zaragoza
Spanish footballers
Association football defenders
La Liga players
Segunda División players
Segunda División B players
Tercera División players
Real Zaragoza B players
Real Zaragoza players
Spain youth international footballers
Spain under-21 international footballers
Spain under-23 international footballers